Archbishop of Riga may refer to:
 Evangelical Lutheran Church of Latvia#Archbishop of Riga, Metropolitan Archbishop and Primate of the Evangelical Lutheran Church of Latvia (Lutheran Church and Anglican/Lutheran Porvoo Communion)
 Roman Catholic Archdiocese of Riga, Metropolitan Archbishop for Latvia in the Roman Catholic Church
 Archbishopric of Riga, the medieval archbishops who held secular authority over the city of Riga